Kirn is a village in Argyll and Bute in the Scottish Highlands on the west shore of the Firth of Clyde on the Cowal peninsula. It now forms part of the continuous habitation between Dunoon and Hunters Quay, where the Holy Loch joins the Firth of Clyde. It originally had its own pier, with buildings designed by Harry Edward Clifford in 1895, and was a regular stop for the Clyde steamer services, bringing holidaymakers to the town, mostly from the Glasgow area.

Schools

Kirn Primary School

Established in 1881 and located on Park Road, the school moved into new premises in 2018. The original building was retained and refurbished.

Dunoon Grammar School

Dunoon Grammar School is situated on Ardenslate Road, next to Cowal Golf Club in Kirn.

Recreation
The three facilities listed below are located on Ardenslate Road.

Cowal Golf Club
Kirn & Hunters Quay Bowling Club
Cowal Indoor Bowling Club

Kirn Pier

Kirn Pier was demolished, the only buildings left are the shore side entry buildings.

Kirn Parish Church

Kirn & Sandbank Parish Church is a red sandstone building in the centre of the village.

Gallery

References

Bibliography
Inspectors want to use Cowal school as model for excellence : Cowal Courier
Argyll, Cowal and Dunoon News | Dunoon Observer and Argyllshire Standard
Kirn Primary hailed as beacon of educational excellence : Cowal Courier

External links

 Dunoon Grammar School - website
 Kirn Primary school - Website
 Kirn Parish Church - Website

Villages in Cowal
Firth of Clyde
Highlands and Islands of Scotland